El Salvador is a municipality and town in the Guantánamo Province of Cuba. It is located immediately north of the provincial capital, Guantánamo.

Demographics
In 2004, the municipality of El Salvador had a population of 45,662.

See also
List of cities in Cuba
Municipalities of Cuba

References

External links

Populated places in Guantánamo Province